

Players

Competitions

Division Three South

League table

Results summary

League position by match

Matches

FA Cup

Appearances and goals

References

Books

1952-53
Northampton Town